The 1959–60 Rugby Union County Championship was the 60th edition of England's premier rugby union club competition at the time.

Warwickshire won the competition for the fourth time and third in succession after defeating Surrey in the final.

Final

See also
 English rugby union system
 Rugby union in England

References

Rugby Union County Championship
County Championship (rugby union) seasons